Andrell D. Rogers (born May 1, 1973), better known as Kilo Ali, formerly Kilo, is an American rapper from Atlanta, Georgia. Kilo Ali recorded mainly bass music (described more closely to Miami bass style music), but also hip-hop tracks with a less distinctive Southern flavor. His most well known singles include "Show Me Love", "Baby Baby", and "Love In Ya Mouth".

As Kilo Ali, he released Organized Bass in 1997 on Interscope, with featured artists including George Clinton, Cee-Lo of Goodie Mob, Big Boi of OutKast, and JT Money. In 2011, Ali was released from prison after serving six years of a 15-year sentence for arson. In June 2021, Ali sued rapper NLE Choppa for copyright infringement for unauthorized use of his 1997 song, "Love In Ya Mouth".

Discography

Albums
 1991: America Has a Problem
 1992: A-Town Rush (No. 67 U.S. Rap)
 1993: Bluntly Speaking
 1993: Git Wit Da Program
 1994: The Best And the Bass
 1995: Get This Party Started (No. 57 U.S. Rap)
as Kilo Ali
 1997: Organized Bass (No. 173 U.S., No. 44 U.S. Rap)
 2010: Sa-La-Meen
 2011: Hieroglyphics

Singles

References

1973 births
African-American male rappers
Ichiban Records artists
Living people
Rappers from Miami
Rappers from Atlanta
21st-century American rappers
21st-century American male musicians
21st-century African-American musicians
20th-century African-American people